The Centre Youth (Senterungdommen or SUL) is the youth organization of the Norwegian Centre Party. Hence, they advocate decentralisation and stress their opposition of the European Union.

Leaders

Torleik Svelle (2019–present)
Ada Arnstad (2016–2019)
Erling Laugsand (2013–2016)
Sandra Borch (2011–2013)
Johannes Rindal (2009–2011)
Christina Ramsøy (2007–2009)
Erlend Fuglum (2004–2007)
Trygve Slagsvold Vedum (2002–2004)
Anne Beathe Kristiansen (2000–2002)
Sigbjørn Gjelsvik (1998–2000)

References

External links
Official website 

Youth wings of political parties in Norway